Emine Hatun (خاتون, "benign" or "trusthworthy") was a consort of Sultan Mehmed I of the Ottoman Empire.

Early life
Emine Hatun was born as a Dulkadirid princess, the daughter of Nasireddin Mehmed Bey, fifth ruler of the Beylik of Dulkadir (reign 1399–1442). Her niece Sittişah Hatun, daughter of her brother Zülkadiroğlu Süleyman Bey, married Mehmed II in 1449.

Marriage
In 1403, when Mehmed had defeated his brother İsa Çelebi and İsfendiyar Bey, the ruler of the Isfendiyarids who had formed an alliance with each other, he returned to Rum, and decided to make some alliances of his own. While he was feasting in Tokat, Karamanid ruler Mehmed Bey sent his head military judge, and ambassadors also arrived from the realm of Dulkadirids. Relations were mended and animosity was removed. Then there was made peace and friendship between them. At that time, gifts and tokens of betrothal were sent to the Emine Hatun, who was thus engaged to the Sultan. Mehmed Çelebi's important marriage alliance with the ruler of the neighboring tribal confederation of Dulkadir, which was especially rich in horses and horsemen, demonstrates his continued emphasis on tribal politics. The alliance proved a great value for Nasireddin Mehmed Bey. This not only gave Mehmed armed assistance in his campaign for empire, but was always ready to attack the eastern provinces of the Karamanid principality.

Dispute over being Murad II's mother
The identity of Sultan Murad II's mother is disputed. According to historians İsmail Hami Danişmend, and Heath W. Lowry, his mother was Emine Hatun. However, according to 15th century historian Şükrullah, Murad's mother was a concubine. Hüseyin Hüsâmeddin Yasar, an early 20th century historian, wrote in his work Amasya Tarihi, that his mother was Şehzade Hatun, daughter of Divitdar Ahmed Pasha.

See also
Ottoman Empire
Ottoman dynasty
Ottoman family tree
Line of succession to the Ottoman throne
List of valide sultans
List of the mothers of the Ottoman Sultans
List of consorts of the Ottoman Sultans
Ottoman Emperors family tree (simplified)

References

Sources

15th-century consorts of Ottoman sultans
Year of birth uncertain
Place of birth unknown
Date of death unknown
Princesses